Conops is a subgenus of flies from the genus Conops in the family Conopidae.

The European species of the subgenus are:
 C. ceriaeformis Meigen, 1824
 C. flavicaudus (Bigot, 1880)
 C. flavipes Linnaeus, 1758
 C. maculatus Macquart, 1834
 C. quadrifasciatus De Geer, 1776
 C. rufiventris Macquart, 1849
 C. silaceus Wiedemann in Meigen, 1824
 C. scutellatus Meigen, 1804
 C. strigatus Wiedemann in Meigen, 1824

References 

Parasitic flies
Conopidae
Insect subgenera